Lebanon participated at the 2018 Summer Youth Olympics in Buenos Aires, Argentina from 6 to 18 October 2018.

Fencing

Lebanon was given a quota to compete by the tripartite committee.

 Girls' Épée - 1 quota

Rowing

Lebanon was given a tripartite invitation to compete.

 Girls' single sculls - 1 athlete

Swimming

Boys

References

2018 in Lebanese sport
Nations at the 2018 Summer Youth Olympics
Lebanon at the Youth Olympics